Farid Amarouche is a French wheelchair athlete. He won the 1991 London Marathon men's wheelchair race in a close finish, setting a new course record of 1:52:52 and beating previous and future winners Hakan Ericsson, Daniel Wesley, and David Holding in the process. He also took part in the 1988 and 1992 Summer Paralympics, winning three gold and three silver medals in the earlier year.

References

External links 
 

Year of birth missing (living people)
Living people
French male wheelchair racers
Paralympic athletes of France
Athletes (track and field) at the 1988 Summer Paralympics
Athletes (track and field) at the 1992 Summer Paralympics
Paralympic gold medalists for France
Paralympic silver medalists for France
Wheelchair racers at the 1988 Summer Olympics
Paralympic wheelchair racers
Medalists at the 1988 Summer Paralympics
Paralympic medalists in athletics (track and field)